King (iKumkani) Maxhob'ayakhawuleza Sandile (21 May 1956 – 11 July 2011) was the son of the late King Mxolisi Sandile "Aa! Bazindlovu", who was the son of King Archie Velile Sandile, and Queen Nolizwe , the daughter of Western Mpondoland King  Victor Poto Ndamase "Aa! Bhekuzulu", and sister to both King Tutor Vulindlela Ndamase  "Aa! Nyangelizwe"  and the wife of Chief Thandathu Jongilizwe Mabandla of the AmaBhele aseTyhume royal clan. He was the 9th descendant of King Phalo, the Son of King Tshiwo.

In 1988 he married his wife, Princess Nomusa Zulu,  who was the daughter of the then Zulu King, the late King Cyprian Bhekuzulu kaSolomon and sister to King Goodwill Zwelithini kaBhekuzulu.

He became ruler of the Right Hand House of the Xhosa Kingdom in 1991 after his mother had been regent during the time when the Ciskeian government had been under the control of Lennox Sebe which was later taken over in the same period by Brigadier Joshua Oupa Gqozo.

Death and funeral

He died at St. Dominic's Hospital in East London  on the 11 July 2011. He was buried at Mngqesha Great Place in King William's Town on the 23 July 2011, he was given state funeral together with royal funeral and  Xhosa King Zwelonke Sigcawu presided at the funeral, his funeral was attended by Prince Mangosuthu Buthelezi, General Bantu Holomisa, ANC Chairperson of the Eastern Cape Phumulo Masualle, government representatives Premier of the Eastern Cape Noxolo Kiviet, Minister of Rural Development and Land Reform Gugile Nkwinti and royal houses of the Zulu royal house, Western amaMpondo, Western abaThembu, amaNdebele and others and other distinguished guests, President Jacob Zuma never attended but sent his condolences to the family and eulogy was made on his behalf by  the ANC parliamentary chief whip Mathole Motshekga.

References
 African Language Association of Southern Africa (2003). South African Journal of African Languages Volume 23-24.
 Strober P., Ludman B., Haffagee F. (2004). Mail & Guardian A-Z of South African Politics

External links
 South African Government Article on King Sandile 

African kings
Xhosa people
1956 births
2011 deaths